Toby "Winema" Riddle (1848–1920) was a Modoc woman who served as an interpreter in negotiations between the Native American Modoc tribe and the United States Army during the Modoc War (also called the Lava Beds War). She warned the peace commission of a possible Modoc attack, and she saved the life of the chairman Alfred B. Meacham when the 1873 attack took place.

She and her family toured with Meacham after the war, starring in his lecture-play "Tragedy of the Lava Beds", to inform American people about the war.  Meacham later published a book about Winema, which he dedicated to her.  In 1891 Toby Riddle was one of the few Native American women to be awarded a military pension by the United States Congress, for her heroic actions during the peace negotiations in 1873. (Her first name also appears spelled as "Tobey" in historical records.)

Early life and education
She was born Nannookdoowah, which means "strange child," as she was born with red-tinted hair. As a girl, she was named Winema, (woman chief) after rescuing some playmates from being caught in cascades in their canoe. As a young woman, she was said to have ridden with raiding parties of men to gather horses from enemy camps. Winema was a cousin of Kintpuash (also known as Captain Jack), the leader of the Modoc tribe at the time of the Modoc War.

Marriage and family
Winema married Frank Riddle, a white settler who had emigrated from Kentucky to California during the California Gold Rush. They settled near her family in the Lost River area and had a son, Charka ("the handsome one"). They also named him Jefferson C. Davis Riddle, in honor of the Army general Jefferson C. Davis who ended the Modoc War.

Interpreters
Winema Riddle was one of several Modoc who learned English, and her husband Frank had learned her language.  They both served as interpreters before and during negotiations related to the creation of the Klamath Reservation.

They served as interpreters again to the peace commission appointed in 1873 to settle the Modoc War. During the 1873 negotiations, sometimes Winema carried messages between General Edward Canby and Kintpuash; as a woman, she was considered peaceful. After taking a message to Captain Jack's Stronghold to schedule a peace talk, Winema learned of a Modoc plot to assassinate Canby. She warned the peace commission, but they went on as planned with the meeting. Canby and Thomas were killed by Modoc, and other peace commissioners and staff were wounded. Toby Riddle was there and saved Alfred B. Meacham from being scalped and killed.

Afterward the US Army, commanded by General Jefferson C. Davis, finally captured Captain Jack and other Modoc leaders. They were tried and convicted before a US military court, and Captain Jack and three others were executed. 153 members of the band were removed as prisoners of war to Indian Territory in present-day Oklahoma. Some other Modoc, including the Riddle family, returned to the Klamath Reservation.

Meacham continued to champion Native American rights. He wrote a lecture-play "Tragedy of the Lava Beds", starring Winema, Frank, and their son Jeff, and toured with them and Klamath representatives across the country for the next two years. They reached New York before returning to make their home in Oregon. Meacham said that Wi-ne-ma was popular with audiences, as she had worked for peace between the peoples. He also published a book about Winema in 1876 and dedicated it to her:

This book is written with the avowed purpose of doing honor to the heroic Wi-ne-ma who at the peril of her life sought to save the ill fated peace commission to the Modoc Indians in 1873. The woman to whom the writer is indebted, under God, for saving his life.

Meacham wrote, the name of

<blockquote>Winema has taken its place beside those of Sara Winnimucca and Sacajawea in the annals of the early west.  The personal daring of these Indian Women and the roles they played as negotiators between their people and the palefaces have lifted them above considerations of race into the ranks of the great women of all time.<ref name="Meacham">Alfred B. Meacham, Wi-ne-ma (The Woman Chief) and Her People, Hartford: American Publishing Company, 1876</ref></blockquote>

Because of her heroic role in trying to save the peace commissioners during the 1873 talks, Meacham petitioned Congress to award Riddle a military pension. In 1891 the US Congress authorized a military pension for Toby Riddle of $25 per month, which she received until her death in 1920. Toby and Frank's son Jeff C. Riddle wrote his own account of the Modoc War, to give the Indian perspective, which he published in 1914.

Toby attended the Centennial Exposition of 1876 in Philadelphia, and the Panama–Pacific International Exposition in San Francisco in 1915. In later years, Riddle lived at Yainax Butte, Oregon, on the Klamath Reservation. Many of the Riddle descendants continue to live in the area of the Klamath Reservation.

Legacy and honors
 Winema Riddle was one of the few Native American women to be honored by the US Congress authorizing a military pension for her because of her heroism.
 Several regional landmarks are named "Winema" in her honor, including the Winema National Forest.

References

Further reading
   
 
 
 

External links

Rebecca Bales, "Winema and the Modoc War: One Woman's Struggle for Peace", Prologue Magazine'', The National Archives
Jeff C. Riddle, The Indian History of the Modoc War, and the Causes that Led to It, Marnell and Company, 1914, Internet Archives, online text with photos
PBS "HIstory Detectives" episode about Toby Riddle

1848 births
1920 deaths
Native American women in warfare
Modoc people
People of the Modoc War
People from Klamath County, Oregon
Women in 19th-century warfare
Military history of Native Americans
United States Army women civilians
20th-century Native Americans
20th-century Native American women
19th-century Native American women
Native American people from Oregon